Tommy Lee Edwards is an American illustrator.  Edwards' varied portfolio includes works created in the realm of comics, video games, books, advertising, film, and animation.

Career
As well as comic-related work he has also worked on film projects, providing the style guides for films like Batman Begins, Superman Returns and Men in Black II as well as providing movie posters, illustrations for role-playing games and other promotional or licensing work.

Edwards other projects include Marvel 1985, with writer Mark Millar, which Millar has said "is about the real world, the world we live in right now, dealing with the villains of the Marvel Universe finding us." He has also provided the art for Turf with Jonathan Ross. Edwards co-wrote a comic book series and made a short film for the multi-platform project Vandroid, published by Dark Horse Comics in 2014.

Bibliography

Comics
Eightball
Batman
Disavowed
Hellboy
The Invisibles
Daredevil
The Matrix
Star Trek
Gemini Blood (with Christopher Hinz, Helix, 1996–1997)
ZombieWorld: Winter's Dregs (with Bob Fingerman, 4-issue mini-series, Dark Horse Comics, 1998, collected in tpb ZombieWorld: Winter's Dregs, 2005)
The Question (with Rick Veitch, 6-issue mini-series, DC, 2005)
Bullet Points (with  J. Michael Straczynski, 5-issue mini-series, Marvel, 2006–2007)
Marvel 1985 (with Mark Millar, Marvel, May 2008)
Turf (with Jonathan Ross, limited series, Image Comics, 2010–2011)
 Vandroid with Noah Smith and Dan McDaid, 2014
 Mother Panic #1–12 with Jody Houser, 2017
 Mother Panic: Gotham A.D #1–6 with Jody Houser, 2018

Film-related
 The Book of Eli- Concept Artist
 Indiana Jones and the Kingdom of the Crystal Skull- Style-Guide and children's books
 Harry Potter and the Sorcerer's Stone - Style Guide
Star Wars - RPG Core Rule Book, children's books, style guide, and Essential Guide books
Batman Begins - Licensing Style-guide
Dinotopia - Movie Promo and Style Guide
Superman Returns - Style Guide
Men in Black II - Style Guide

Notes

References

External links

Grau, Raul. Tommy Edwards poses the question, Comixfan Forums (September 26, 2004).
Interview with Artist Tommy Lee Edwards, EUCantina.net
Tommy Lee Edwards: Saga Artist, Star Wars: expanded Universe (January 2, 2003)
The Question About Tommy Lee Edwards, Scoop (August 28, 2004)
Parker, Charley. Tommy Lee Edwards, lines and colors (March 10, 2007)
Wickliffe, Andrew. Talking "TheBLVD Sketchbook" with Tommy Lee Edwards, Comic Book Resources (June 16, 2006)

Living people
American illustrators
Place of birth missing (living people)
Year of birth missing (living people)